The London, Tilbury and Southend Railway 1 class was a class of 4-4-2T suburban tank engines. Thirty-six were built between 1880–1892, by Sharp, Stewart and Company and Nasmyth, Wilson and Company. They were the first locomotives owned by the London, Tilbury and Southend Railway and were the first 4-4-2T locomotives to operate in Britain.

Background
Prior to 3 July 1880, all train services on the London, Tilbury and Southend Railway (LT&SR) had been run by the Great Eastern Railway (GER) under contract. An injunction prevented the GER from building locomotives for the LT&SR after this date. The railway therefore approached William Adams, a former locomotive superintendent of the GER, then working for the London and South Western Railway who supervised the new design which was officially ascribed to Thomas Whitelegg.

Design
The design was based on William Adams's 46 class 4-4-0T but with  driving wheels and an extended coal bunker supported by a radial truck making them the first 4-4-2 tanks to be used in the United Kingdom.

Eighteen locomotives were built by Sharp, Stewart & Co. in 1880-1881, followed by a further twelve in 1885, and a final batch of six by Nasmyth, Wilson & Co. in 1895. They were used on the railway's commuter services between London Fenchurch Street railway station and Upminster, Southend and Tilbury. The class appear to have been entirely satisfactory and most survived in service for fifty years or more. One member of this class was recorded as having hauled a train of 240 tonnes at an average of 82.2 km/h to Southend with water taken during runs.

Numbering
On the LTSR they were numbered 1–36 and named for places on or near their railway line. In 1912, the LTSR was absorbed by the Midland Railway and the locomotives were renumbered 2110–2145 and the names removed. At the grouping in 1923, all passed to the London, Midland and Scottish Railway and at first retained their former MR numbers. However between 1923 and 1927 twenty-five were progressively renumbered—2110–2119 to 2200–2209 in 1923, 2120–2124 to 2210–2214 in 1925, and 2125–2134 to 2190–2199. In 1930, all 36 were renumbered in the 2056–2091 range.

Retirements started in 1929, and by 1936, all had been withdrawn. None were preserved.

Fleet details

References

External links
http://anno.onb.ac.at/cgi-content/anno-plus?aid=lok&datum=1914&page=9&size=45
http://orion.math.iastate.edu/jdhsmith/term/slgblts.htm

01
4-4-2T locomotives
Sharp Stewart locomotives
Nasmyth, Wilson and Company locomotives
Railway locomotives introduced in 1880
Standard gauge steam locomotives of Great Britain
Scrapped locomotives